Arseniy Pavlovych Batahov (born 5 March 2002) is a Ukrainian professional football midfielder who plays for Zorya Luhansk.

Career
Batahov was born in Kharkiv Raion of the Kharkiv Oblast and is a product of the different youth sportive schools of Kharkiv Oblast and FC Dnipro Youth Sportive School system. In April 2018 he was promoted to the main-team squad of FC Dnipro and made his debut in the Ukrainian Second League.

In July 2018, he joined the new created SC Dnipro-1 and made his debut for this club in the winning match against FC Sumy on 12 April 2019 in the Ukrainian First League as a start-squad player.

On 2 July 2022, he moved to Zorya Luhansk.

References

External links
 

2002 births
Living people
Ukrainian footballers
Association football midfielders
Ukraine youth international footballers
Ukraine under-21 international footballers
FC Dnipro players
SC Dnipro-1 players
FC Polissya Zhytomyr players
FC Zorya Luhansk players
Ukrainian Premier League players
Ukrainian First League players
Ukrainian Second League players
Sportspeople from Kharkiv Oblast